"Allez regrets" is a chanson usually credited to  Franco-Flemish composer Hayne van Ghizeghem. Together with the composer's "De tous biens plaine", this was one of the most famous chansons of the age, and was much used as a basis for variation and as a cantus firmus for  mass settings.

Cholji (ref. 1) lists five chanson settings, including those by Alexander Agricola and Loyset Compere, and five mass settings, including that by Josquin

References

External links
Cholji, Irena. "Borrowed Music: Allez regrets and the Use of Pre-existent Material." In Companion to Medieval and Renaissance Music, ed. Tess Knighton and David Fallows, 165-76. New York: Schirmer Books, 1992.  see  for summary

Renaissance chansons